Centurion is a metro station on the Gautrain rapid transit system in Centurion, Gauteng. The station opened on 2 August 2011 as part of the second phase of the Gautrain project.

Location
Centurion station is located in the former independent municipality of Centurion, in the southern part of the City of Tshwane Metropolitan Municipality. The station is located adjacent to West Avenue which runs along the northern bank of Centurion Lake.

Transit-oriented development
In common with other Gautrain stations, Centurion station acts as the focal point of transit-oriented development. The most prominent of the initiatives near the station is the Centurion Symbio-City development, which aims at developing the highest skyscraper in Africa in the middle of Centurion Lake.

Station layout
Centurion station has two tracks with two side platforms and parking for 2000 cars. Due to high demand for parking and a lot of rail users having to park outside the station, the Bombela Consortium purchased additional land to build additional parking in Von Willich Avenue on the Northern side of the station.

Services
Trains on the North-South Line of the Gautrain system serve Centurion station, running northbound to Pretoria and Hatfield and southbound to Sandton and Johannesburg Park Station. In addition, Centurion has four integrated feeder bus routes to Highveld (CEN1), Rooihuiskraal (CEN2), Wierdapark (CEN3), and Southdowns (CEN4).

References

External links
Official Gautrain site

Gautrain
Railway stations in South Africa
Railway stations opened in 2011
City of Tshwane Metropolitan Municipality
Railway stations in South Africa opened in the 21st century